This is a list of electoral results for the electoral district of Coburg in Victorian state elections.

Members for Coburg

Election results

Elections in the 1990s

Elections in the 1980s

Elections in the 1970s

Elections in the 1960s

 The two candidate preferred vote was not counted between the Labor and DLP candidates for Coburg.

Elections in the 1950s

 Mutton was elected as an Independent in the 1955 election, but joined the Labor party in 1956.

Elections in the 1940s

 Preferences were not distributed.

 Preferences were not distributed.

Elections in the 1930s

 Two party preferred vote was estimated.

Elections in the 1920s

References

Victoria (Australia) state electoral results by district